Werner Schmidt (born January 18, 1932) is a Canadian former politician, a teacher, and school principal.

Political career
Schmidt was vice-president of Lethbridge Community College when he was chosen to succeed Harry Strom as leader of the Alberta Social Credit Party following the defeat of Strom's government in 1971 despite the fact that Schmidt had never held a seat in the Alberta legislature. Schmidt defeated former Highways Minister Gordon Taylor, former Education Minister Robert Curtis Clark in an upset victory at the 1973 Alberta Social Credit leadership convention. After his leadership election, Schmidt ran in the electoral district of Calgary-Foothills in a by-election held on June 25, 1973 but was defeated by Stewart McCrae.

Under his leadership the party only won four seats in the 1975 provincial election and Schmidt, failing to win his own seat, returned to private life.

Schmidt left Alberta and moved to British Columbia joining the Reform Party of Canada at its inception and was a member of its first Executive Council. He was an unsuccessful candidate in the 1988 federal election before winning a seat in the 1993 election representing Okanagan Centre. He was re-elected in 1997 representing Kelowna. He won election again in 2000 as a Canadian Alliance MP with 60% of the vote and won his fourth straight victory in the 2004, this time as a Conservative.

As a Member of Parliament, Schmidt served as Critic for Industry, Critic for Public Works and Government Services and Critic for Seniors. He has also been a member of several Standing Committees including the Standing Committee on Industry, the Standing Committee on Finance, and the Standing Committee on Procedure and House Affairs.

He served as Caucus Chair of the Canadian Alliance and Caucus Vice Chair when the party became the Conservative Party of Canada.

Schmidt retired from politics with the dissolution of parliament for the 2006 federal election.

Electoral history

References

External links
 

1932 births
Living people
Alberta Social Credit Party leaders
Alberta Social Credit Party candidates in Alberta provincial elections
People from Kelowna
People from Lethbridge County
Reform Party of Canada MPs
Canadian Alliance MPs
Conservative Party of Canada MPs
Members of the House of Commons of Canada from British Columbia
Canadian Mennonites
Canadian people of German descent
21st-century Canadian politicians